Gazi Baba is a neighbourhood in the City of Skopje, North Macedonia, and the seat of Gazi Baba Municipality.

Demographics
According to the 2021 census, the town had a total of 38.426 inhabitants. Ethnic groups in the town include:

Macedonians 28.887
Persons for whom data are taken from administrative sources 3,064
Albanians  2,755
Romani 1,099
Serbs 1,026
Bosniaks 607
Others 430
Turks 413
Vlachs 145

Gazi Baba has a mixed population that includes minorities of Romani and Turks, yet the neighborhood is associated with Albanians in North Macedonia.

References

External links

Gazi Baba Municipality
Neighbourhoods in Gazi Baba Municipality
Neighbourhoods of Skopje